Edward Morant may refer to:
 Edward Morant (politician) (1730–1791), British politician and plantation owner
 Edward Morant (cricketer, born 1772) (1772–1855), English amateur cricketer
 Edward Morant (cricketer, born 1868) (1868–1910), English cricketer and diplomatic attaché